Johan Axel Gustaf Acke, usually called J.A.G. Acke, originally Andersson, (7 April 1859, Bergielund, Stockholm - 5 September 1924, Vaxholm), was a Swedish painter, illustrator and sculptor. He was also an amateur architect and designed two villas for himself.

Biography
Acke was the son of the botanist and professor Nils Johan Andersson and the artist . His brother was the artist and naval commander, . His sisters were also artistically active. He grew up in Bergielund, located near Vasa Park. His father served as a curator at the Swedish Museum of Natural History and had his official residence there. As a child, he accompanied his father on his research trips to Lapland and Gotland and created illustrations for his work.

He was only fourteen when he began taking basic courses at the Royal Swedish Academy of Fine Arts. He continued there until 1882, then took lessons at a private school operated by  Edvard Perséus. He made study trips to the Netherlands, Belgium and France, where he studied etching. He disliked academic studies and joined with the rebellious young artists at the Royal Academy, but completed his studies there, nonetheless.

Önningeby colony and marriage

He went to Åland in 1886 and became a member of the Önningeby colony, a Swedish-Finnish artists' colony that existed from roughly 1886 to 1914. The founder was the Finnish painter Victor Westerholm. He painted prolifically there and engaged with the other artists, who saw him as an odd, energetic and humorous person. However, the artists all shared a disdain for the prevailing Academic style and the Düsseldorf School, taking their inspiration from naturalism and Impressionism. Again, unlike the others, he would paint en plein aire in the winter.
 
In 1887, he met his future wife Eva Maria Topelius in Önningeby but, originally, they remained just friends. When his relationship with Anna Wengberg, another Swedish artist who painted in Önningeby, began to unravel, he married Topelius in 1891. Her father was the Finnish-Swedish writer Zachris Topelius.

Career in Sweden and Finland 
In the 1890s, he participated in restoring the medieval wall paintings in Uppsala Cathedral. For several years, he worked on a large canvas, "Snöljus", which depicted winter fishing through the ice in Åland. He sent the painting to the Salon in Paris, but it was rejected. After that, he and Eva made fewer visits to Åland. At times, they lived in  Finland and participated in the Finnish art scene. After her father's death in 1898, they came to be increasingly focused on the Swedish art community.

In 1901, the couple moved to Vaxholm, and built a home called the "Villa Columbines". The marriage remained childless but, during a trip to Italy in 1900 to 1901, they met an Italian family, whose three-year-old son Fausto they adopted in 1903. Another acquaintance was the poet, Verner von Heidenstam, whose portrait Acke painted. From 1902 to 1903, he and some Finnish artists made illustrations for his father-in-law's children's books. He had his name legally changed to Acke in 1904. In 1912, he made an extended trip to Rio de Janeiro, which influenced his paintings, especially his way of depicting light.

His last major work involved the frescoes at the Stockholm City Hall. He was working on a mural at the National History Museum, representing the philosophy of Emanuel Swedenborg, when he suddenly died, at home (the "Villa Akleja"), of apparent heart failure.

Selected paintings

References

Sources
Konttinen, Riitta (1991) Konstnärspar Schildts, Helsingfors. Pgs. 111-126 
Kjell Ekström and Håkan Skogsjö (2003). Konst på Åland: en guide. Mariehamn: Skogsjömedia. pgs.30-37 
Nationalencyklopedin Vol.1 A-ASA, (1993). Bra böcker, Höganäs.

External links

Biography @ the Svenskt Biografiskt Lexikon
More works by Acke @ ArtNet
Works by Acke @ the Nationalmuseum

1859 births
1924 deaths
19th-century Swedish painters
Swedish male painters
20th-century Swedish painters
Art Nouveau designers
Art Nouveau painters
Art Nouveau sculptors
Art Nouveau illustrators
Swedish furniture designers
Artists from Stockholm
20th-century Swedish sculptors
Swedish male sculptors
19th-century Swedish sculptors
19th-century Swedish male artists
20th-century Swedish male artists